Jonas L.A. is the third soundtrack by the American pop rock group Jonas Brothers and their only soundtrack for Jonas L.A.. It was released on July 20, 2010 to positive reviews and debuted at #7 on the Billboard 200. It has sold 132,000 copies in the United States.

Singles

"L.A. Baby (Where Dreams Are Made Of)" was released as promotional single on Radio Disney on May 7, reaching #1 on the Top 30 Countdown, becoming their only #1 hit from the album on that chart, and it was released as a digital download on iTunes on June 29.

Critical reception

Stephen Thomas Erlewine of AllMusic stated "Perhaps they're playing by the rules more than they did on Lines, but that's a good thing: they're letting themselves act like kids, not adults, winding up with a clutch of lively, effervescent pop."

Track listing

Enhanced CD
 Full-length music videos
 Lyrics
 The Special Short of the Nick Jonas featuring China Anne McClain

Charts

Weekly charts

Year-end charts

Release history

References

2010 soundtrack albums
Jonas Brothers albums
Television soundtracks